Özgür Kart (born 18 April 1982) is a Turkish former footballer.

Kart previously played for SV Wacker Burghausen in the German 2. Fußball-Bundesliga and Kasımpaşa S.K. in the TFF First League.

Kart transferred to TSV Ampfing in August 2009.

References

1982 births
Living people
Turkish footballers
SV Wacker Burghausen players
Hamburger SV II players
SSV Jahn Regensburg players
Kasımpaşa S.K. footballers
2. Bundesliga players
TFF First League players
German people of Turkish descent
People from Traunstein (district)
Sportspeople from Upper Bavaria
Association football forwards
Footballers from Bavaria